George Griffiths may refer to:
George Griffiths (British politician) (1880–1945)
George Griffiths (Australian politician) (1840–1905)
George Griffiths (cricketer) (born 1938), Australian cricketer
George Griffiths (footballer, born 1865) (1865–1918), Welsh footballer
George Griffiths (footballer, born 1924) (1924–2004), English footballer
George Griffiths (historian) (1933–2014), New Zealand historian and journalist
George Richard Griffiths (1802–1859), merchant and banker in the then Colony of New South Wales

See also
George Griffith (disambiguation)
Georges Griffiths (1990–2017), Ivorian footballer
Griffiths (surname)
George Griffin (disambiguation)